Šišić is a South Slavic surname. Notable people with the surname include:

Aladin Šišić (born 1991), Bosnian footballer
Aldijana Šišić (born 2000), Bosnian footballer
Antonio Šišić (born 1983), Croatian footballer
Emir Šišić, former pilot of SFR Yugoslav Air Force
Ferdo Šišić (1869–1940), Croatian historian
Ismet Šišić (born 1958), Bosnian footballer
Mirnes Šišić (born 1981), Slovenian footballer

Bosnian surnames